2019–20 UAE Division one was the 44th Division one season. Team changes for the season include Al Bataeh who joined the league, while Hatta and Khor Fakkan was  promoted to the UAE Pro League, while Dibba Al Fujairah and Emirates were relegated. However, the season was cancelled with 12 out of 14 UAE Pro League clubs voting in favour of cancelling the season and not a single division one club had a say on the matter. The decision was done due to the COVID-19 pandemic in the United Arab Emirates and no team were rewarded with promotion.

Team Changes

To Division 1 
Relegated from UAE Pro League
Dibba Al Fujairah 
Emirates

Joined
Al Bataeh

From Division 1 
Promoted to UAE Pro League
Hatta
Khor Fakkan

Stadia and locations

Note:' Table lists clubs in alphabetical order.

Personnel and kits

Note: Flags indicate national team as has been defined under FIFA eligibility rules. Players may hold more than one non-FIFA nationality.

Managerial changes

League table

Results

Season statistics

Top Goal Scorers

Number of teams by Emirates

References

2019–20 in Asian second tier association football leagues
2019–20 in Emirati football